10 Años (Spanish "diez años") or 10 Anos (Portuguese "dez anos") may refer to:

Music
10 Años, album by Antonio Flores
10 Años, album by Los Caminantes (1999)
10 Años, album by Grupo Gale (1999)
10 Años, album by Myriam Montemayor Cruz (2012)
10 Años, album by Neyma (2011)
10 Años, album by Ojos de Brujo (2010) 
10 Anos, album by Xuxa (1996)
10 Anos Depois, album by Jorge Ben
10 Años: Un Panteón Muy Vivo, album by Panteón Rococó (2006)